Willy Singer (born 23 February 1949) is a German racing cyclist. He rode in the 1977 Tour de France.

References

External links
 

1949 births
Living people
German male cyclists
Place of birth missing (living people)
People from Unterallgäu
Sportspeople from Swabia (Bavaria)
Cyclists from Bavaria